The University of Santo Tomas is one of the oldest existing universities and holds the oldest extant university charter in the Philippines and in Asia. It was founded on April 28, 1611, by the third Archbishop of Manila, Miguel de Benavides, together with Frs. Domingo de Nieva and Bernardo de Santa Catalina. It was originally conceived as a school to prepare young men for the priesthood. Located Intramuros, it was first called Colegio de Nuestra Señora del Santísimo Rosario and later renamed Colegio de Santo Tomás in memory of Dominican theologian Saint Thomas Aquinas. In 1624, the Colegio was authorized to confer academic degrees in theology, philosophy and arts. On November 20, 1645 Pope Innocent X elevated the college to the rank of a university and in 1680 it was placed under royal patronage.

Through the centuries, the university was given the following titles: Royal, Pontifical, and Catholic University of the Philippines. In 1785, for the loyalty shown by the administration and students who volunteered to defend Manila against the British invasion, King Charles III of Spain granted it the title of "Royal University". Pope Leo XIII made the University of Santo Tomas a "Pontifical University" on 1902 and in 1947, Pope Pius XII bestowed upon it the title of "The Catholic University of the Philippines". Thus its complete name is Pontifical and Royal University of Santo Tomas, Manila.

In 1927, with the continuing increase in enrollment, the university moved from Intramuros to its present site which covers an area of 21.5 hectares in the district of Sampaloc, Manila. Since its foundation, the university's academic life has been interrupted only twice: 1898 to 1899, during the Philippine revolution against Spain; and 1942 to 1945, during the Japanese occupation of Manila, when the University of Santo Tomas was transformed by the Japanese military into an internment camp.

Founder

Although a few Dominican missionaries worked together to establish the university – including Miguel de Benavides, Bernardo Navarro, and other old professors from the higher colleges and universities in Spain – the founding of the university is attributed mainly to Miguel de Benavides, the first to give a fund for the maintenance of the institution.

Miguel de Benavides was born in 1550 in the Castilian town of Carrión de los Condes, province of Palencia, Spain, in the heart of the austere, grain-producing Tierra de Campos. Benavides was steeped in the theological principles of Francisco de Vitoria and Bartolomé de las Casas, who exchanged the prestigious professorial chair for remote and difficult new missions of the Philippines. He was chosen to govern the newly created Diocese of Nueva Segovia (now Vigan) as its First Bishop (1595–1601). He wrote the Doctrina Christiana in Chinese, the first book printed in the Philippines.

Later, he was promoted to be the third Archbishop of Manila (1602–1605). On July 26, 1605, Benavides died.

In an appearance before King Philip II, he obtained a royal decree ordering the holding a referendum in the Philippines towards political self-determination. It took place in 1599. The people chose to be under the sovereignty and protection of the monarch. This event was the only plebiscite known in the entire colonial history before the 20th century.

Benavides monument

In December 1878, the University Rector conceived the idea of erecting a monument with a statue of the founder in the Plaza de Santo Tomás in Intramuros. The Benavides Monument was made in Paris in 1889 through funds collected by the faculty, students and friends of the university. It was inaugurated on July 2, 1891 – opening of the school year. The monument is a bronze figure of Benavides on a pedestal facing the old campus in Intramuros. The base of the statue has the name of the sculptor and year of the make: Tony Noël, 1889. The pedestal was decorated with the seals of the Dominican Order and the university, as well as plaques on which were written the history of UST and a brief biography of the archbishop.

The statue was blown from its place by an artillery shell during the 1945 Battle of Manila, completely obliterating its marble pedestal. It was re-erected on November 13, 1946, inside the UST campus in Sampaloc, Manila.

The present bronze statue of Benavides is in front of the Main Building of the Sampaloc campus, rising on top of a granite pedestal flanked by four lions each bearing the coats-of-arms of the Philippines, Spain, Holy See, and the Dominican Order. He dons the rugged habit of the pioneer Dominican missionaries. His right hand is elevated in the preaching fashion, his index finger pointing to heavens. His left hand rests on his chest holding a book bearing the words Santo Evangélico on its cover. A skull cap covers his head, and a pectoral cross hangs from his neck, the symbols of Episcopal dignity.

Establishment

The university seems to have originated from the Dominican Conventual School of Santo Domingo (known often by the name of Our Lady of the Holy Rosary) with which it carried a common existence until 1611. The Dominican Order arrived in 1587. A program was held to solemnize the feast of St. Dominic, an old university student at Palencia and the founder of Order of Preachers. The celebration was held in the main hall of the cathedral in the presence of prominent dignitaries of all religious orders and of the civil authorities. The academic act was directed by a professor of theology, Pedro de Soto.

From that moment Bishop Domingo de Salazar – first Bishop of the Philippines – was inspired to found a college-university similar to those in Mexico, where religious and lay persons might pursue college studies; and to begin with, a "School of Grammar" was established in addition to the "Escuela de Tiples". At that same time, it was determined that fathers Miguel de Benavides and Miguel de Santamaria give conferences in the Episcopal Palace in the cathedral, and in the Convent-School of Santo Domingo.

In his will dated July 26, 1605, Feast of St. Anne, Fray Miguel de Benavides  made provision for the foundation of the institution by bequeathing his library and goods valued at ₱1,500 which served as the nucleus of funds for the establishment of an institution of higher learning. This nucleus was increased to ₱7,140 by donations made by Pablo Rodríguez, Andrés Hermosa, and Juan Morales. After Benavides' death, in the same year, his confreres carried on – albeit with small funds – in order to realize his idea. As Fr. Sánchez wrote in his book, "Few Institutions have begun their lives in this world with such scanty material means as did our University."

In 1609, permission to open the college was requested from King Philip III, which only reached Manila in 1611. On April 28, 1611, the document of foundation was signed by Baltasar Fort, Provincial of the Dominican Province of the Holy Rosary; Francisco Minayo, Prior of the Santo Domingo Convent; and Bernardo de Santa Catalina, Commissary-General of the Holy Office of the Philippines, which thus converted into University thirty-four years later. Notary Juan Illian witnessed the signing of the act of foundation.

It was Bernardo de Santa Catalina who executed the document of foundation stating that "the residue of his (Benavides') legacy should be applied to the founding and endowing of a college. He carried out Benavides’s wishes and was able to secure a building near the Dominican church and convent in Intramuros for the College.

The historians of the University affirmed that it was "the outgrowth if the early educational labors inaugurated by the Dominican Order shortly after the arrival (in this country) of its first missionaries in 1587."

Early years

The institution started its operation with courses in theology, arts, and philosophy as the College of Our Lady of the Most Holy Rosary. In 1617, the college was renamed as College of Santo Tomas after the Dominican theologian St. Thomas Aquinas (1225–1274).

Prior to the act of foundation, King Philip III granted, through the Governor-General, the permission to open a college in Manila. So in 1612, Fr. Domingo González, O.P., Lector of the Santo Domingo Convent, was appointed to work on the completion the organization of the college. In that same year, when classes also began, the Dominican Province of the Holy Rosary accepted the college, an act which amounted to the Dominican Order's assuming the responsibility in the operation of the institution. In 1619, in the name of King Philip IV, the Governor-General of the Philippines, gave his approval. The Holy See granted, although indirectly or implicitly, recognition to the new college in 1619. In 1627, Pope Urban VIII also authorized the college to confer academic degrees, so that the said academic degrees had both royal and papal approval. Although the college had only been in operation for a few years, records show that degrees were already being conferred in 1640.

Upon petition of King Philip IV, Pope Innocent X converted the college into a university on November 20, 1645, in his brief, In Supreminenti, thus conferring upon it the status of university under the patronage of the Holy See. UST was later recognized as a "university for life" by the Real Audencia of Spain. Then on May 12, 1680, King Charles II of Spain extended Royal Patronage to the university. It was also that year in 1645 that the Master General of the Dominican Order, acting under the authority granted by the Roman Pontiff, assumed the authority to appoint its rector and with to "have charge of the healthy and happy direction of the University". It was thus a confirmation of the fact that the rector of the university became the highest administrator of the university, with the implementation of the different curricula, methods of instruction, and the adoption of "laudable customs of other universities". The course in Canon Law was started in 1732.

The campus stood in Intramuros opposite the old church of Santo Domingo. It is a site which was bounded on the north by Calle Aduana, on the east by Plaza España, on the south by Plaza Santo Tomás, and on the west by the Ayuntamiento.

First graduates
The earliest records in the archives of the university lists twelve graduates from 1629 to 1645. The graduates were conferred doctorate degrees in theology and master's and licentiate degrees in the arts. Investitures held since 1663 were recorded in the official graduation book called Libro de Asiento de Grados de la Universidad de Santo Tomas.

Eighteenth century

Title of Royal University
Philip IV had granted his Royal approval on November 27, 1623. Official royal patronage was accorded to the University on May 12, 1680, by King Charles II of Spain.

However, the title "Royal University" was only bestowed by King Charles III on May 20, 1785, during the eight-year term of Fr. Domingo Collantes, O.P.. The title "Real" was given to the UST in recognition of its loyalty to the Crown after the university volunteered its students for the military defense of Manila during the recurrence of war between the allied countries of France, Spain against England.

Nineteenth century

The 1865 decree for the revamp of secondary education brought about major developments for UST. It was tasked as a Bureau of Education with the rector as its director. This meant that UST was to handle all matters pertaining to secondary education from the appointment of the school professors; the submission of grades, and the signing of the awarding of diplomas to the bachelor of arts graduates.

In 1870 Segismundo Moret, the Minister of colonies, issued two decrees that totally reorganized the Philippine education system. The first decree abolished all secondary schools and placed them under a single "Instituto Filipino." The second decree converted the University of Santo Tomás, being the only official institution of higher learning in the islands, into a Universidad de Filipinas, thus the name Royal and Pontifical University of the Philippines.

The fall of the Spanish liberal government (which led to Moret's removal) and the monarchical restoration abolished these decrees. The university was handed back to the Dominicans. It was only be in 1877 that Spain recognized the university again as an institution administered by the religious.

The university closed its doors during the Philippine Revolution of 1896 because of the ensuing disorder. It reopened though for the school year 1897–1898 when the rebels retreated to the provinces. The arrival of the Spanish–American War to the Philippines and the resumption of the Revolution in 1898 led again to the suspension of classes. UST closed for the school year 1898–1899.

José Rizal
José Rizal, national hero of the Philippines, entered the university in 1877. He enrolled in the pre-Law course, which was made up of philosophical subjects. The course was called Metaphysics. He passed the course with the highest grades.

He later chose to enter a career in medicine. And in 1878–1879, he took simultaneously the pre-Medical course and the first year of Medicine; this was against the rules, but Rizal was favored with a dispensation which few received. The pre-Medicine course was called Curso de Ampliación, because the student, having taken already Physics, Chemistry, and Natural History in the high school, now took an advanced course on the same subjects. Rizal did not take in Santo Tomas "class of physics" he described in El Filibusterismo, but the course of Ampliación.

While studying medicine, Rizal remained an above-average, although his grades were not high as those that he received in classes in the arts and letters. This continued even in his later studies in Madrid. Rizal was not recorded to have ever complained about his grades in the university, while he did complain about those he received in Madrid.

In the fourth and last year in the university, only seven students remained, and Rizal was one of them. And he ended that year in second place.

Twentieth century

Following the Philippine revolution, Spanish members of the Dominican Order were removed from their parishes and left the Philippines in 1899, eventually turning over some of their churches and mission stations to secular clergy, while retaining other parishes and foundations, with American friars taking over them.

In compliance with the requirements of Act No. 1459 also known as the Corporation Law of 1906, the university was incorporated. The application contained the following statements: That the name of the corporation is and will be known as the "Royal and Pontifical University of Santo Tomas" and abbreviated as "University of Santo Tomas", "that the corporation is located in Manila with its main office at 139 Calle de Sto. Tomas, Intramuros"

At the beginning of the 20th century, a  plot of land in the Sulucan Hills of Sampaloc, Manila was donated by Francesca Bustamante Bayot to the Dominican fathers for the university's expansion outside Intramuros. In 1927, Main Building, the first earthquake-proof building in the Philippines, was then inaugurated at the Sulucan site.

For the first time in the history of UST, the Faculty of Pharmacy opened its doors to women in the academic year 1924–1925. It was one of the first universities in the Philippines to become co-educational when it admitted women. There were 24 women enrollees out of the 93 who matriculated for the said Faculty that school year. The university, however, had been granting certificates through the School of Midwifery since 1879. Permission was given to the College of Education in 1926, to Faculty of Philosophy and Letters in 1927 followed by the Faculty of Medicine and Surgery and College of Commerce in 1932. The admission of women no longer became an issue in later years. Only the Faculties of Sacred Theology, Canon Law, and Philosophy remained exclusively for men.

In 1925, it became one of the first universities in the Philippines to require the use of English as a medium of instruction, to replace Spanish. When it was appropriate to Filipinize the administration, Fr. Leonardo Z. Legazpi, O.P. became the first Filipino Rector of UST on October 9, 1971.

Since its establishment in 1611, the university's academic life was interrupted only twice: from 1898 to 1899, during the Philippine Revolution against Spain, and from 1942 to 1945, during the Japanese occupation of the country. In its long history, the university has been under the leadership of more than 90 Rectors. UST's first Filipino rector was Fr. Leonardo Legaspi, O.P. who served UST from 1971 to 1977.
In recognition of its achievements, a number of important dignitaries have officially visited the university, among them, during the last three decades: Pope Paul VI on November 28, 1970;  King Juan Carlos I of Spain in 1974 and 1995; Mother Teresa of Calcutta in January 1977 and again in November 1984; Pope John Paul II on February 18, 1981, and January 13, 1995 (as part of the World Youth Day 1995).

Title of Pontifical University
On September 17, 1902, in his constitution, Quae Mari Sinico, Pope Leo XIII bestowed upon the university the title of Pontifical University.

This title may be considered a reiteration of the honor and protection previously granted when, in 1619, the Holy See had already issued the brief "Charissimi in Christo", which enabled students who had studied in the Dominican Colleges of the Indies for five years to receive degrees, in 1629 and 1639 by Pope Urban VIII, and in 1645, when Pope Innocent X converted the College of Santo Tomas into a university.

UST is Asia's only remaining Pontifical university. Annuario Pontificio, the annual official directory of the Holy See, in its edition for the year 2000, lists all the Catholic and or Pontifical institutes of higher learning, grouping them into two categories: Roman Ateneums and Catholic Universities. Only 24 are called Pontifical, and of these 24, six are located in Rome (Gregorian University, Lateran University, Urbanian University, University of Santo Tomas (known as The Angelicum), Salisian University and Holy Cross University); three are in Europe; fourteen in Latin America; and one in Asia, this one being the University of Santo Tomas of Manila. The oldest university to be denominated by the Holy See as Pontifical is the Jesuit Gregorian University in Rome. Although founded in 1551, it was Pope Pius IX who, in 1873, permitted the school to assume the title of ‘Pontifical University.’" All the other abovementioned 23 universities received the title of Pontifical in the 20th century. The University of Santo Tomas of Manila, the oldest of them, is second only to the Gregorian University to be declared Pontifical by the apostolic constitution Quae Mari Sinico in 1902.

Tricentennial celebration
For five days, on December 16–20, 1911, the university celebrated its 300th Anniversary. The main features of the celebration included: a Solemn High Mass in honor of the founder of the university, Miguel de Benavides; the unveiling of the commemorative plaque for the festivities; the unveiling of a plaque placed at the pedestal of the statue of Benavides in the college site in Intramuros; the laying of the foundation stone for the future building at University in Sampaloc; and a big banquet.

Around 300 guests, both civil and ecclesiastical authorities, professors, and alumni of the university attended the banquet at the Colegio de San Juan de Letran. The solemn investiture of the latest graduates of the university was held in the Santo Domingo Church.

The laying of the cornerstone of a new building of the university in Sampaloc was hailed by the people. On the last day of the celebrations, a fireworks display was held.

Pope Pius X, and members of the Philippine Hierarchy sent congratulatory messages to the university on the occasion of its Tricentenary celebrations.

World War II

During World War II, the Japanese converted the campus into an internment camp for civilians, foreigners and POWs. War crimes against American soldiers (Filipino soldiers were granted amnesty) and civilians living abroad occurred in Santo Tomas.

On the evening of January 2, soon after the Japanese forces entered Manila, as well as on January 3, many Americans and other Allied citizens were taken to the University Camp. The camp population totaled 3,259 of which 2,200 were American, 74 British, 920 Dutch, 28 Polish, 36 Mexicans and 1 Nicaraguan.

All the buildings of the university in Sampaloc with the exception of the seminary, the Printing Press and two first floors of Main Building were occupied. The war internees occupied three floors of the Main Building, the entire Education Building (presently UST Hospital), the Domestic Science building, and the School of Mines building. Communication between them and the outside world was prevented by the Japanese as much as possible.

Outside fences in España avenue were completely covered with tall sawali (woven bamboo matting), while the concrete walls on all other sides of the Campus remained high, preventing view between the internees and the outside world. The years of Japanese occupation were years of great suffering for the internees.

The university authorities cooperated with the internees and the Japanese officials. They were given several duties by the Japanese, which they performed. Dominican Fathers were still allowed to direct the use of disposition of the university buildings, equipment, and power plant, although subject to the final approval or disapproval of the Japanese authorities.

During the liberation of Manila buildings of the university in Intramuros, as well as in Sampaloc were damaged or destroyed. The facilities in Intramuros were burned by the Kenpeitai on February 8, 1944. As for those in Sampaloc, though they were not destroyed, some portions were slightly damaged during the shellings, including the rooms on the West of the Main Building, some rooms of the Education building, and the university gymnasium.

There were about 335 casualties among the internees, 35 died and 300 were wounded. Some were buried in a vacant lot outside the Forbes gate, and others were buried inside the campus.

The Dominicans, who introduced the first printing press in the Philippines, were fortunate to have been able to transfer the UST printing press from Intramuros to the España campus in the nick of time in 1940, a year before the Pearl Harbor bombing.

Title of Catholic University of the Philippines
On April 30, 1947, Pope Pius XII, through the Decree "Sacrae Congregationis de Seminariis et Studiorum Universitatibus", bestowed upon it the title of "The Catholic University of the Philippines". The UST is the only Catholic university in the region and in terms of student population, the largest Catholic University in the world located in one campus.

Semiseptcentennial celebration
Pope John XXIII sent a warm personal letter to the university. He called the university "Christianae Sapientiae emicantissimum" or the "most resplendent light of Christian Wisdom" in the seven page communication dispatched to Manila from the Vatican through the Apostolic Nuncio. Through the Rector Magnificus, the Pope extended his felicitations on the university's golden jubilee and maternal blessings for continued growth, prosperity, and peace. He also congratulate the university for being "A very valid bulwark of Christian civilization".

Throughout 1961, the university celebrated its 350th year. The principal festivities such as the alumni banquet and the Gala Concert were held on March 4–7, 1961.

Filipinization of the university

The Filipinization movement of the Spaniard-dominated Dominican Order in the Philippines began in 1951. Filipino Dominicans sought key positions in UST while students organized demonstrations and demanded the ouster of Spanish Dominicans.

Filipinization of UST reached its culmination when Rev. Fr. Leonardo Z. Legaspi, O.P. became the first Filipino rector of university in 1971. However, Legaspi was criticized for the supposedly slow process of appointing Filipino Dominicans to administrative positions. Under his rectorship, he implemented the translation of the heading of all diplomas to Filipino.

Filipino Dominicans in the university campaigned for the Filipinization not only of UST but also of the entire Philippines. It was fulfilled when the Dominican Province of the Philippines was established on December 8, 1971, with Fr. Rogelio Alarcon as its first prior provincial.

Modern history
 UST had a total enrollment of approximately 45,000 students, 33,000 undergraduates and 5,000 students in medicine, Law, and the Graduate School. The university admits about 8,500  new students out of 50,000 applicants per year.

After 400 years, the university has five clusters of discipline: Science and Technology; Arts and the Humanities; Education and the Social Sciences; Medicine and Health, and the Ecclesiastical Faculties – spread over 21 faculties, colleges, and institutes.

Quadricentennial celebration

The agenda ahead of the university's quadricentennial in 2011 includes the introduction of new academic programs, improvements in the university's infrastructure, and other projects to raise UST's national and international prominence and promote its role as a social catalyst.

Plans to open satellite campuses in Santa Rosa, Laguna and another in General Santos City are being put in place.

Physical developments for the Sampaloc campus are ongoing. The Plaza Mayor in front the Main Building, together with the Quadricentennial Square which will feature the Tetraglobal sculpture, the Quadricentennial Fountain, and the Quadricentennial Alumni Walkway were constructed in 2006. To accommodate the needs of extra space for the growing number of student activities, the UST Tan Yan Kee Student Center was built in front of the Miguel de Benavides Library. The more-than-80-year-old Main Building, and the artifacts and art works in the UST Museum of Arts and Sciences were recently placed under the preservation of the UST Heritage Conservation program in December 2008.

The UST Benavides Cancer Institute, part of the five-year redevelopment plan and expansion of the UST Hospital for its 60-year celebration and the quadricentennial celebration, was also established in the year 2006.

Part of the university's infrastructure modernization is the construction of the P800-million, state-of-the-art, four-storey gymnasium capable of seating 5,792, designed by Thomasian architects José Pedro Recio and Carmelo T. Casas. The construction has been completed in time for the Quadricentennial Celebration of the university. This is through the able leadership of the rector of the university, Rev. Fr.  Rolando V. de la Rosa, O.P. Another project which is under construction is the Thomasian Alumni Center, a 10-storey building that will be a symbol of the outstanding achievements of Thomasian alumni all over the world. Part of the construction cost has been donated by alumni, notably the UST Medical Alumni in America.

The UST Publishing House in 2001 launched its quadricentennial project, “400 Books at 400!”. From theology to literature to medicine-related disciplines written in both Filipino and English, the Publishing house is more than half way in completing its race.

Spanish monarchs

The series of benefices, favors and privileges granted to UST by the Spanish monarchs started in 1609 when Philip III issued a royal cédula requesting from the governor and the audencia a report on the projected college. He petitioned Pope Paul V for the granting of faculties of Philosophy and Theology. These faculties were implemented by order of Philip IV in 1624, and three years later this monarch petitioned Rome for the extension of these faculties for an additional ten years. He was the same monarch who petitioned the Pope to elevate the college to the level of a university in 1645. 

King Charles II, in 1680, added to this list of benefices already granted by his predecessors, when in Royal Cédula he formally declared that the university be placed under his royal patronage.

Another Royal Cédula of Charles II, with two others from Philip V, his successor, resulted in 1733 in the creation of the Faculties of Civil and Canon Laws. At the same time, the Holy See granted the university faculties to give academic degrees in those two disciplines and in others that might eventually be established.

In 1781 King Charles III authorized the university to prepare its own statutes, independent of those of the University of Mexico through, which, up to that time, the university was governed.

When, in 1762, Manila was occupied briefly by the British, the rector of the university, Fr. Domingo Collantes, organized four companies of university youth to help in the defense of the city. Acknowledging this act of loyalty, King Charles III, in his Royal Cédula of March 7, 1785, expressed his "gratitude and benevolence," and renewed his protection and patronage, and granted the university the title of "Very Loyal", as well as the title and honors corresponding to it, as a "Royal University".  

In 1865 Queen Isabel II declared the University of Santo Tomas the center for public education throughout the Philippines, and affiliated to her all colleges and schools throughout the country, and constituting the rector of the university the supervisor and inspector of all the centers of learning so affiliated to the university.

In 1871 the Faculties of Medicine and Pharmacy were established, and three years later, by authority of a Royal Order given by Alfonso XII, the School for Notaries was created.

In 1649, in response to the expressions of royal concern shown over its welfare, the university community addressed Philip IV, saying that the university "requests Your Royal Highness that you keep her within your Royal Solicitude, because she has been, from her very beginnings, a fruit of your royal bounty, and from the desire that she should grow and progress ever through efforts so Royal and so Catholic."

In expression of gratitude for the nearly 300 years of royal benevolence and to establish a continuous affinity between Spain and UST, the university bestowed the title of Royal Patron to King Juan Carlos (Royal House of Bourbon) of Spain in February 1974 (then Prince of Spain).

The University seal

The seal of the University of Santo Tomas is a shield quartered by the Dominican Cross. Superimposed on the cross is the sun of Saint Thomas Aquinas, patron of Catholic schools, after whom the university is named. The sun is actually made similar to the Sun of May.

Encircling the Dominican cross are:
 On the upper left is the papal tiara, indicating that the UST is a pontifical university.
 The upper right shows the lion derived from the Coat of Arms of Spain, indicative of royal patronage throughout the greater part of the university's centuries-old existence.
 The lower left is occupied by the sea-lion originating from the old coat of arms of the City of Manila, the national capital, symbolizing the Republic of the Philippines.
 The rose on the lower right is a symbol of the Blessed Virgin Mary under whose patronage the university was placed from its very beginnings.

The symbols are rendered in gold (except for the Dominican cross which is black and white), and are set on a field of light blue, the Marian color.

The Tongues of Fire is the official logo for the Quadricentennial celebration of the university.  This logo features the outline of the UST Main Building Tower as a concrete symbol of the stability, integrity and 400 years of existence of the university. From the cross of the Main Building emanate four tongues of fire that spell out U, S, and T. The tongues of fire reference the future of the university, some ideals, and are reminiscent of the stripes of the Tiger, the school's mascot. The Quadricentennial logo was designed by Dopy Doplon, a Thomasian.

Colors
The colors of the seal, as officially defined by the university's identity guidelines, are as follows:

Evolution

The official seal used by the university in 1868 to 1935 was a cardioid shield. On top of the seal was the world, the emblem of the university. A figure of a dog which symbolized fidelity was also seen together with the world. Below it was the sun of Aquinas.  Just below the sun were three ovals. The left oval contained the Pontifical arms symbolizing the Apostolic concession by which the College of Santo Tomas was raised to be a university. The center oval contained the Dominican cross. It was also surrounded by white lilies and crowned by a star. The right oval contained the national arms of Spain (coat of arms of the Spanish East Indies) to indicate the protection which Philip IV vouchsafed to the university. On the topmost portion of the three ovals was the world, the emblem of the university. The shield was surrounded by the Golden Fleece.

The 1935–1938 seal, 1937–1946 seal, and 1957–1983 seal had changes depending on the government/regime the Philippines had. The 1935–1938 seal contained the coat of arms of the Commonwealth of the Philippines. The coat of arms of the Spanish East Indies was retained in the 1937–1946 seal. The 1957–1983 seal replaced the coat of arms of the Commonwealth of the Philippines with the coat of arms of the Philippines.

In the 1960s, the seal was a variant of the 1868–1935 official seal (a cardioid shield with an orb and cross, the hound with the burning torch, and directly below the sun of St. Thomas Aquinas whose rays extend throughout the whole of the seal). The seal then consisted of a white field with four ovals arranged in a "T" fashion, featuring the coats of arms of the Republic of the Philippines to the left, the Holy See in the center, of Spain (only the arms without the Pillas of Hercules) to the right; and below the Holy See oval that of the Dominican Order, surrounded by a rosary, crowned by a star ("St. Dominic's star"), and flanked by a palm branch (representing martyrdom) to its left and white lilies to the right. All these symbolize the university as Pontifical, Dominican, & Spanish in origin, as well as being established in and under the laws of the Philippines. The upper half of the seal is flanked by laurel leaves on both sides and the lower half by the collar-chain of the Order of the Golden Fleece, symbolizing the university as Royal. The inner border of the seal is lined with the Latin name of the university (Pontificia et Regalis S(ancti) Thomæ Aquinatis Universitas Manilana).

When a new seal was unveiled in June 2011, it received several negative feedback from the students through social networking sites like Facebook and Twitter. The changes were made after the Curia in Rome suggested for a uniformity in the titles and name of UST. The university's council of Regents decided to include UST's name in the new seal and drop the titles of Royal and Pontifical because they are not part of the official name of university. The seal was revised a month after and is currently being used today.

The present seal bears the honorific titles and the name of the university.

Establishment of colleges

Past and present degree-conferring colleges

Non degree-conferring departments

References

External links
University of Santo Tomas – Official website
UST Miguel de Benavides Library
UST Museum of Arts and Sciences

University of Santo Tomas
Santo Tomas
University of Santo Tomas